James Gerard Dinan (born 1959) is an American investor, hedge fund manager, philanthropist. He founded York Capital Management in 1991.

Early life and education
James Gerard Dinan was born to a Roman Catholic family in 1959 in Baltimore, Maryland, one of five children of Robert and Jeannette Dinan. His father was a textile engineer and his mother a homemaker. In 1969, the family moved to Paxton, Massachusetts. In 1977, Dinan graduated from the private Bancroft School. He then went on to earn a B.S. from the Wharton School of the University of Pennsylvania with a degree in economics in 1981. While at the University of Pennsylvania, Dinan joined Alpha Chi Rho, a northeastern fraternity. In 1981, he took a job with stock research firm, Donaldson, Lufkin & Jenrette (DLJ). In 1985, Dinan earned a M.B.A. from Harvard University.

Investment career
In 1985, he took a job at the merger arbitrage firm Kellner DiLeo & Company. In 1987, the market crashed and he lost his entire $600,000 in savings. In 1991, he was able to raise $3.6 million from his former DLJ colleagues and started his own hedge fund named York Capital (named after the street he was then living on, York Avenue). In 1993, his fund earned credibility with a 33.8 percent return and by 2000, the fund had over $610 million in assets. In 2010, he sold 33% of York to Credit Suisse for $425 million. In 2011, he made a $1 million donation to the Museum of the City of New York. In July 2014, Dinan gained partial ownership of the NBA's Milwaukee Bucks. In June 2017, he named two eventual successors to lead York Capital in the future. In 2018, York Capital Management had $20.5 billion assets under management.

Personal life
Dinan is married to Elizabeth R. Miller, and they have three children together. Dinan lives in Manhattan and also owns homes in Westchester County, New York, Nantucket, Massachusetts, and on the Caribbean island of Saint Barthélemy.

References

Further reading

External links
TABB TV Replay: "Charlie Rose Interviews James Dinan" November 8, 2012

American hedge fund managers
American billionaires
Harvard Business School alumni
Wharton School of the University of Pennsylvania alumni
1959 births
Living people